Oskar Sepre (20 May 1900 Kabala Parish (now Türi Parish), Kreis Fellin – 23 November 1965 Tallinn) was an Estonian communist politician. He was a member of II Riigikogu. He was a member of the Riigikogu since 10 March 1924. He replaced Hans Heidemann. On 9 April 1924, he resigned his position and he was replaced by August Mühlberg.

In 1924, Sepre was arrested by Estonian authorities and sentenced to 149 years of forced labor for his participation in the anti-state Workers' United Front communist front organization. He was released by the 1938 Amnesty Act.

References

1900 births
1965 deaths
People from Türi Parish
People from Kreis Fellin
Workers' United Front politicians
Communist Party of Estonia politicians
People's commissars and ministers of the Estonian Soviet Socialist Republic
Members of the Riigikogu, 1923–1926
Members of the Supreme Soviet of the Estonian Soviet Socialist Republic, 1940–1947
First convocation members of the Supreme Soviet of the Soviet Union
Second convocation members of the Supreme Soviet of the Soviet Union
University of Tartu alumni
Estonian prisoners and detainees
Prisoners and detainees of Estonia

Burials at Metsakalmistu